Jock Beattie (5 January 1907 – 10 February 1977) was a Scotland international rugby union player.

Rugby Union career

Amateur career

Beattie played for Hawick Linden.

He then played for Hawick.

He played for the Co-Optimists.

Provincial career

Beattie captained the South of Scotland District side.

He played for the Scotland Possibles side against the Scotland Probables side in the final trial match of the 1937-38 season to determine international selection. He impressed the selectors in the first half and then turned out for the Probables in the second half.

International career

He played for Scotland 23 times in the period 1929 to 1936.

He also represented the Barbarians.

References

1907 births
1977 deaths
Scottish rugby union players
Scotland international rugby union players
Rugby union players from Hawick
Hawick RFC players
Hawick Linden RFC players
Co-Optimist Rugby Club players
South of Scotland District (rugby union) players
Barbarian F.C. players
Scotland Possibles players
Scotland Probables players
Rugby union locks